Shkaryata is a rural locality (a village) in Dobryansky District, Perm Krai, Russia. The population was 14 as of 2010. There are nine houses and one street in the village. Postal code is 618736.

Geography 
Shkaryata is located on the Vilva river, 53 km east of Dobryanka (the district's administrative centre) by road. Golubyata is the nearest rural locality.

References 

Rural localities in Dobryansky District